The 1915 Ole Miss Rebels football team represented the University of Mississippi during the 1915 college football season. The season was the first under former Vanderbilt athlete Fred A. Robins.

Schedule

References

Mississippi
Ole Miss Rebels football seasons
Ole Miss Rebels football